The Sinking of the Laconia is a two-part television film, first aired on 6 and 7 January 2011 on BBC Two, about the Laconia incident; the sinking of the British ocean liner RMS Laconia during World War II by a German U-boat, which then, together with three other U-boats and an Italian submarine, rescued the passengers but was in turn attacked by an American bomber.

The film is a British-German co-production, written by Alan Bleasdale, directed by Uwe Janson, and with Andrew Buchan, Brian Cox, Ken Duken, Morven Christie, Lindsay Duncan, Thomas Kretschmann and Franka Potente in the leading roles. It was shot in Cape Town, South Africa.

Plot 
[[File:RMS Laconia Crest.jpg|thumb|left|150px|Badge of the 1921 Cunard liner Laconia]]

In September 1942, 650 nautical miles from the west coast of Africa, the German U-boat  sinks the British troopship Laconia, which is en route from Cape Town to the United Kingdom.

On realising that there are Italian POWs and civilians amongst the shipwrecked, who face certain death without rescue, U-boat Commander Werner Hartenstein (Duken) makes a decision that goes against the orders of German Naval High Command. The U-boat surfaces and Hartenstein instructs his men to save as many survivors as they can. U-156 crams 200 people on board the surfaced submarine, takes another 200 in tow in four lifeboats, and tries to give relief to the remaining shipwrecked who surround the U-boat in lifeboats and small rafts. Hartenstein attempts to dive with all survivors on board and, although this puts the submarine into a crash dive, control is regained and it resurfaces. He has a Red Cross flag displayed and a message sent to the Allies to organise rescue of the survivors. The Italian prisoners are taken off U-156 by another U-boat and an Italian submarine.

The British requested the Americans to look for Laconia survivors, but did not inform them of the submarine's rescue effort; when a B-24 Liberator from Ascension Island finds the submarine, it is ordered to attack. Soon after the bomber attack, U-156 resumes her hunting duties, leaving behind the lifeboats with the British survivors to be picked up by a Vichy French naval surface ship sent by Admiral Dönitz. While admiring Hartenstein's actions, Dönitz also reluctantly composes the Laconia Order to other U-boat commanders not to rescue survivors in future. The French ship arrives; one lifeboat leaves the others to make for the coast of west Africa, which it eventually reaches. One British merchant officer is injured in the American attack and remains with U-156 until it reaches port, where he is taken prisoner. Dönitz awards Hartenstein the Ritterkreuz and proposes to repost him to a desk job at naval command. Preferring to remain with his men, Hartenstein refuses the post and a final on screen message reports U-156s later sinking with no survivors.

Production
The production was a cooperation of the British BBC with the German ARD Degeto and SWR Fernsehen, executed by TalkbackThames and Teamworx.UFActs No. 89, December 2009 It was shot in Cape Town, South Africa.
The idea to bring the story of the Laconia to screen was conceived in 2004 by the Talkback Thames head of drama Johnathan Young.

Full cast

RMS Laconia

U-156

Royal Navy at Sierra Leone

U-boat command
 Thomas Kretschmann - Admiral Karl Dönitz, Befehlshaber der U-Boote
 Nikolai Kinski - Korvettenkapitän Walter Drexler, Dönitz's aide

US Army Air Force at Ascension Island

Other
 Simon Verhoeven - Korvettenkapitän Harro Schacht, captain, 
 Paul Savage - Egyptian Customs Officer

Follow-up programme
On 9 January 2011, BBC Two broadcast a half-hour documentary, The Sinking of the Laconia: Survivors' Stories, featuring testimonies from the actual survivors of Laconia. Beginning 14 April 2012, Ovation television aired The Sinking of the Laconia'' in the United States.

See also
 Laconia Order

Footnotes

References

External links
 

2010 television films
2010 films
British television films
German television films
English-language German films
English-language television shows
2010s German-language films
German-language television shows
Das Erste original programming
Films set in the 1940s
Seafaring films based on actual events
U-boat fiction
World War II submarine films
RMS Laconia (1921)
2010s English-language films
Films directed by Uwe Janson